Antonio Guerra may refer to:

 Tonino Guerra (1920–2012), Italian poet, writer and screenwriter
 Antonio Guerra (bishop) (died 1500), Roman Catholic prelate